Gazi Golam Mostafa (died 19 January 1981) was a Bangladesh Awami League politician and a former member of the East Pakistan provincial assembly. He was nicknamed the "Lord of the Bastis". ("Basti" means "slum" in Bengali.)

Career 
Mostafa was a former president and general secretary of the Dhaka city Awami league. He was a close associate of Sheikh Mujib, the first president of Bangladesh, and often said to be his right-hand man. He was a former chairman of the Bangladesh Red Crescent Society and the former President of Awami League's Dhaka city unit. 

As President of Awami League's Dhaka City Unit, he and then Treasurer of Dhaka Metropolitan Awami League, R.K Chowdhury spoke about organizational activities of the city, how can it be better and where was the problem. R.K Chowdhury, Mostafa and Sheikh Mujibur Rahman used to discuss these issues regularly in the evenings. Gazi Golam Mostafa was known to be very tough, powerful, and free-wheeling. He was also known to be extremely corrupt. There are allegations against him that during the famine of 1974, as the chairman of the Red Crescent Society, he took hold of millions of blankets and tins of baby food sent to Bangladesh as relief for the people through foreign aid, and he began to profit out of these goods by selling to the people for whom it was sent. It is said that one out of 7 tins of baby food and one out of 13 blankets sent as relief reached the poor during the famine.

Major Dalim's Abduction 
In 1974, Mostafa kidnapped Major Shariful Haque Dalim and his wife from the Dhaka Ladies Club after an argument. It was Dalim's cousin's wedding reception in the Dhaka Ladies Club. Dalim's only brother-in-law Bappi (his wife Nimmi's brother) was attending from Canada. Mostafa's son occupied the chair in the row behind Bappi and pulled Bappi's hair from the back. Bappi scolded the boy for his behavior and told him not to sit on the row behind him anymore. Mostafa's sons (who were close friends of Sheikh Kamal) and some associates forcefully abducted Dalim, Nimmi, the groom's mother, and two of Dalim's friends (both of whom were distinguished freedom fighters) in Microbuses owned by the Red Crescent. Mostafa was taking them to the Rakhi Bahini headquarters but later took them to the residence of Sheikh Mujibur Rahman.

Sheikh Mujibur Rahman mediated a compromise between them and made Mostafa apologize to Nimmi. When news of the abduction spread, the 1st Bengal Lancers ransacked Mostafa's and took his whole family prisoner. They also set up check posts all over the city searching for Major Dalim and the abductees. Some officers lost their jobs as a result. The officers involved, including Shariful Haque Dalim, were later orchestrators of the coup on 15 August 1975 and the assassination of Sheikh Mujibur Rahman.

Imprisonment 
After the fall of Sheikh Mujib's regime, he was caught by the public while trying to flee with huge amount of money to India via the border. He was jailed and was sentenced to ten years' imprisonment by a martial law court, and released on 28 March 1980 during the regime of General Zia.

Death 
After his release from jail, he was planning to visit the holy shrine of Khwaja Muinuddin Chishti at Ajmer and thus moved with his family to India where he stayed in Delhi for some time. While traveling to Ajmer by car, he and his entire family were killed when a huge truck ran over their car. He died on 19 January 1981.

References

Awami League politicians
Year of birth missing
1981 deaths
People from Dhaka
Bangladesh Krishak Sramik Awami League executive committee members
Bangladesh Krishak Sramik Awami League central committee members